The Second Thai–Lao Friendship Bridge over the Mekong connects Mukdahan Province in Thailand with Savannakhet in Laos. The bridge is 1600 meters (1.0 mi) long and 12 meters (39 ft) wide, with two traffic lanes.

Traffic on the bridge drives on the right, as in Laos, while traffic in Thailand drives on the left; the lane-change is on the Thai side.

History

Bridge construction began on 21 March 2004. Supports and spans were constructed on shore, then moved out onto pylons in the river by crane.

The total cost was about 2.5 billion baht (US$70 million), funded largely by a Japanese loan. An opening ceremony was held on 19 December 2006, The bridge opened to the general public on 9 January 2007.

See also 
 First Thai–Lao Friendship Bridge
 Third Thai–Lao Friendship Bridge
 Fourth Thai–Lao Friendship Bridge
 Fifth Thai–Lao Friendship Bridge
 Sixth Thai–Lao Friendship Bridge
 Seventh Thai–Lao Friendship Bridge
 Transportation in Laos
 Transport in Thailand

References

External links 
 Bridge Failure Database

Extradosed bridges
Extradosed bridges in Laos
Extradosed bridges in Thailand
Thai–Lao Friendship Bridge 02
Thai–Lao Friendship Bridge 02
Thai–Lao Friendship Bridge 02
Thai–Lao Friendship Bridge 02
Thai–Lao Friendship Bridge 02
Thai–Lao Friendship Bridge 02
Thai–Lao Friendship Bridge 02
Thai–Lao Friendship Bridge 02
Thai–Lao Friendship Bridge 02
Bridges completed in 2006